Richard Montañez is an author and businessman. He is best known for his claim of having invented Flamin' Hot Cheetos.

Early life
Montañez was born to a Mexican American family in Ontario, California. One of ten siblings, he was raised in a migrant labor camp in Guasti, an unincorporated community outside of Los Angeles. 

He dropped out of school and worked as a laborer before being hired at the age of 18 as a janitor for Frito-Lay, at its Rancho Cucamonga factory, in 1976. According to records at Frito-Lay, Montañez was promoted to a machinist operator position by 1977.

Flamin' Hot Cheetos
According to his account, when a Cheetos machine broke down, Montañez took home a batch of unflavored snacks and seasoned them with spices reminiscent of Mexican street corn. He pitched this idea to then-CEO Roger Enrico over the phone and was invited to deliver an in-person presentation, which he prepared for by researching marketing at the public library. He presented the product as appealing to the growing Latino market, and provided samples in plastic bags that he had hand-decorated and sealed. It was soft-launched six months later to a test market in Los Angeles, and approved for national release in 1992. Newsweek reported that the flavor, since expanded to a full product line, "rejuvenated the brand" and garnered billions in revenue. 

In 2021, a Los Angeles Times article disputed Montañez's claim, reporting that based on an internal investigation at Frito-Lay, he was not involved in creating this product line. A spokesperson for Frito-Lay stated, "we value Richard's many contributions to our company, especially his insights into Hispanic consumers, but we do not credit the creation of Flamin' Hot Cheetos or any Flamin' Hot products to him." According to the article, however, Montañez did in fact rise from a floor-level position to a marketing executive at Frito-Lay, and he was involved in pitching new products.

Later career
Montañez was subsequently named vice president of multicultural sales & community promotions for PepsiCo. He is also a motivational speaker and instructor in leadership.

Montañez is the author of two books based on his life experiences: A Boy, a Burrito, and a Cookie, and Flamin' Hot: The Incredible True Story of One Man's Rise from Janitor to Top Executive. He is the subject of a planned biopic, Flamin' Hot, directed by Eva Longoria.

References

External links

Living people
American business executives
American inventors
Janitors
American people of Mexican descent
People from San Bernardino County, California
Year of birth missing (living people)